Sohbat Gola is a village in Sindh province of Pakistan. It is located at 28°17'0N 69°2'10E with an altitude of 71 metres (236 feet).

References

Villages in Sindh